Buyongsan is a mountain in the province of Gangwon-do, South Korea. Its area extends across the city of Chuncheon and the county of Hwacheon.

See also
List of mountains in Korea

Notes

References

Chuncheon
Hwacheon County
Mountains of Gangwon Province, South Korea
Mountains of South Korea